Firoz Irani is an Indian actor, producer, director and writer, mainly working in Hindi entertainment and Gujarati cinema.

Selected filmography
As actor

2022 Adko Dadko
2018 GujjuBhai - Most Wanted (cameo)
2015 Saako-363, Amrita Ki Khejadi (as Deewan Girdhar Das Bhandari)
2014 Kon Halave Limdi Ne Kon Zulave Pipli (as Anna)
2013 Patan Thi Pakistan
2011 Preet Jhuke Nahi Saath Chhute Nahi (as Himmatsinh)
2010 Musaa: The Most Wanted (as Bhai) (as Feroz Irani)
2008 Yaar Meri Zindagi
2006 Pyare Mohan (as Feroz Irani)
2006 Ek Var Piyu Ne Malva Aavje
2004 Aitraaz
2003 Main Hoon Daku Rani
2002 Humraaz (Guest appearance)
1995 Aatank Hi Aatank (as Feroze Irani)
1995 Paapi Farishte 
1995 Police Lock-up
1994 Jai Maa Karwa Chauth
1994 Rakhwale
1993 Phoolan Hasina Ramkali (as Feroz Irani)
1993 Rani Aur Maharani
1992 Ganga Bani Shola
1992 Angaar
1992 Dushman Zamana
1990 Naag Nagin (as Ringo)
1990 Tejaa
1990 Zakhmi Zameen
1990 Shetal Tara Unda Pani
1989 Mahisagarne Aare
1989 Sindoor Aur Bandook (as Police Commissioner)
1989 Lashkar
1988 Zulm Ko Jala Doonga (as Thakur)
1986 Badkaar
1986 Chambal Ka Badshah (as Phiroz Irani)
1985 Mahasati Tulsi (as Bhagwan Shri Bholeynath)
1985 Atma Vishwas
1985 Meru Malan
1984 Hiran Ne Kanthe
1983 Marad No Mandvo
1983 Dodh Dhaaya
1983 Lohi Nu Tilak
1982 Dholi
1982 Apne Paraye
1982 Charotar Ni Champa
1982 Jugal Jodi
1981 Albeli Naar
1981 Chhel Chabili Sonal
1981 Rano Kunwar
1977 Chandu Jamadar
1977 Do Chehere
1970 Jigar Ane Ami (as Younger brother of Jigar)
2022 Pran Chhute Pan Mari Preet Na Tute (Gujarati film)

Director
 Hote Hote Pyar Ho Gaya (1999) (as Feroze Irani)
Writer
 Hote Hote Pyar Ho Gaya (1999) (additional screenplay) (as Feroze Irani)
Producer
 Hote Hote Pyar Ho Gaya (1999) (executive producer) (as Feroze Irani)
Other
 Anokhi Ada (1973) (production assistant) (as Feroz Irani)

Television
 Burey Bhi Hum Bhale Bhi Hum as Ambalal Popat (2009)
 Baa Bahoo Aur Baby as Baba Bakshi (2009)
Moti Ba Ni Nani Vahu as Mr Zaveri (2021–present) on Colors Gujrati
 Aafat (1994)

References

External links
 
 

Living people
Irani people
Indian male film actors
Indian male television actors
Indian male soap opera actors
Male actors in Gujarati-language films
Male actors in Hindi cinema
Male actors in Hindi television
20th-century Indian male actors
21st-century Indian male actors
Hindi-language film directors
Hindi film producers
Indian male screenwriters
1945 births